Velukkudi Krishnan (born 1963), sometimes rendered U. Ve. Velukkudi Krishnan Swamigal, is a Hindu Srivaishnava religious scholar. He was born in the village of Velukkudi in present-day Thiruvarur district. His Aacharyan is Sholinghur Sri Doddacharyan Swamigal from the lineage of the Acharya associated with the famous Doddacharyar Sevai in the Kanchipuram Varadaraja Swami Garuda sevai. He delivers lectures in person, distributes them on compact disc and MP3, and broadcasts them on TV channels of Vijay TV, Sri Venkateswara Bhakthi Channel 2 Tamil (SVBC 2 Tamil) and Podhigai TV. His program called 'guru parampara' in svbc 2 Tamil is very popular all over Tamil Nadu.  He operates the Kinchitkaram Trust, which translates, publishes, and distributes religious materials, conducts classes, and locates and maintains temples and other religious and historic sites. He is known for his meticulous and chaste rendering of the Vedas, the Upanishads, Naalayira Divya Prabhandham and the Puranas, frequently including human perspectives in his upanyasams.

Krishnan's father, Velukkudi Varadachariar, was also noted as a Vedic scholar. swamy was given both a religious and latest education, after which he went to work as a chartered accountant.  After his father's death in 1991, the 28-year-old Krishnan began delivering lectures.  Finding that his accounting career conflicted with his religious life, he left his job in 1996 to devote himself full-time to religious work.

Krishnan speaks Sanskrit, Tamil and English, and lectures and distributes recordings in both of the latter languages.  He has lectured in a number of foreign countries, including the United States, Canada, the UK, Singapore, UAE, Bahrain, Australia and Oman.  He lives in the temple city of Srirangam in Tamil Nadu.

Through Kinchitkaram Trust, he releases a thematic calendar every year. The difficult philosophical ideas are explained in simple language with illustrations.

References

External links
http://www.kinchit.org/
http://www.thehindu.com/news/cities/Tiruchirapalli/moulding-them-through-childfriendly-technique/article6325453.ece?ref=sliderNews

Indian Vaishnavites
Tamil scholars
Scholars from Chennai
Living people
1963 births